Harry Sellars (9 April 1902 – 30 December 1978) was an English footballer and football manager, who played in the English Football League for Stoke City. He made 395 appearances for Stoke in all competitions, and helped the club to win the Third Division North title in 1926–27 and the Second Division title in 1932–33. He went on to briefly manage League of Ireland side Dundalk in 1947. His son John also played for Stoke in the 1950s. Together, father and son played 808 league and cup games for the club.

Playing career
Sellars was born in Beamish, Durham and joined his local club Darlington as an amateur in 1919. The "Quakers" found him a job cleaning train carriage windows an improvement on his previous employment as a miner. Sellars turned down a trial at Manchester United in favour of turning professional with ambitious Northern League club Leadgate Park who offered him £2 a week. He was recommended to several Football League clubs by various scouts and Stoke City manager Tom Mather signed him on 15 December 1923. He began his Stoke career at inside-left and scored on his debut against Clapton Orient on 26 January 1924. He was in and out of the side in the next three seasons before Sellars converted to half-back in 1925–26 as Stoke were relegated to the Third Division North. A strong half-back line with Sellars, Cecil Eastwood and Tom Williamson helped Stoke win the title and return to the Second Division.

He became a steady and consistent performer for Stoke and helped them win promotion to the First Division in 1932–33. He remained in the side until he injured his knee in September 1935, which allowed Frank Soo to take his place. In total Sellars made 395 appearances, scoring 19 goals, for Stoke in a 13-year career at the Victoria Ground. He then helped Congleton Town to win the Cheshire Senior Cup and had a short spell at Port Vale (without playing a first team game). During World War II he worked at the PMT bus in depot in Hanley and once the war was over he returned to Stoke to become Bob McGrory's assistant manager and first-team coach. In his role he helped to train his son John.

Managerial career
Sellars was recruited to manage League of Ireland side Dundalk at the start of the 1947–48, before he agreed to a mutual termination of his contract in October 1947.

Career statistics
Source:

Honours
Stoke City
 Football League Third Division North: 1926–27
 Football League Second Division: 1932–33

References

1902 births
1978 deaths
Footballers from County Durham
English footballers
Association football midfielders
Darlington F.C. players
Leadgate Park F.C. players
Stoke City F.C. players
Congleton Town F.C. players
Port Vale F.C. players
Northern Football League players
English Football League players
Dundalk F.C. managers
League of Ireland managers
English expatriate football managers
Expatriate football managers in the Republic of Ireland
Association football coaches
Stoke City F.C. non-playing staff